This is a list of cathedrals, churches and chapels in the City of London. The list focuses on the more permanent churches and buildings which identify themselves as places of Christian worship. The denominations appended are those by which they self-identify.

History

Wren and Anglican churches
Before the Great Fire of London in 1666, the City of London had around 100 churches in an area of only one square mile (2.6 km2). Of the 86 destroyed by the Fire, 51 were rebuilt along with St Paul's Cathedral. The majority have traditionally been regarded as the work of Sir Christopher Wren, but although their rebuilding was entrusted primarily to him, the role of his various associates, including Robert Hooke and Nicholas Hawksmoor especially, is currently being reassessed and given greater emphasis.

With regard to Anglican churches, as opposed to Catholic churches, nonconformist chapels or meeting houses, the designs of the Wren office provided a new standard for British church architecture ever since,  as well as giving a distinctive face to the Anglican church in London. Wren also designed a number of Anglican churches outside the City, including St James's, Piccadilly and St Clement Danes. After the Wren era, Hawksmoor was responsible for six of the great Anglican churches in the East End of London (for example Christ Church, Spitalfields), and other architects such as Hooke, James Gibbs and John James contributed significantly to Anglican church architecture in London.

Metropolitan area
 London's churches and chapels are extraordinarily numerous and diverse. Anglican and nonconformist churches and chapels are most numerous, but there are also many Catholic churches as well as places of worship for non-Christian religions.

Most of the Anglican churches lie within the Anglican dioceses of London to the north and Southwark to the south. For historical reasons, the Anglican churches in London north of the Thames but east of the River Lea fall within the Diocese of Chelmsford, and those in the London Boroughs of Bexley and Bromley fall within the Diocese of Rochester. A few Anglican churches in the Barnet area fall into the Diocese of St Albans, reflecting the historical association of Barnet with Hertfordshire. The Catholic dioceses that cover Greater London are, north of the Thames and west of the Lea, the Diocese of Westminster; south of the Thames the Archdiocese of Southwark; and north of the Thames and east of the Lea, the Diocese of Brentwood. There are still some two thousand Anglican churches alone, across the capital and if nonconformist and other denominations are included, they cover every age and style, in the design and evolution of which at least six hundred different architects have made contributions. As London expanded during the early 19th century, many new churches and chapels were built independently by the growing nonconformist urban population; to match the growth in nonconformist churches and chapels, the Anglican "Waterloo church" building programme saw numerous Anglican churches constructed across south London in the first half of the century.

Significance
Although many churches and chapels were entirely or partly lost to 19th-century demolitions and to bombing in the Second World War, many historic, architecturally significant and religiously significant buildings remain, particularly in the City of London and the neighbouring City of Westminster. A number of the churches are mentioned in the nursery rhyme Oranges and Lemons. Churches in this list belong to various denominations, as indicated.

List of churches
The City of London is not a London borough but, while being a ceremonial county in its own right, is within Greater London.
In 1666 there were 96 parishes within the bounds of the City. Today the following continue Christian witness in one form or another in the heart of London. A map can be found here: The area has 46 churches for just 9,400 inhabitants; the ratio of one church to every 204 people is the highest in England, but the statistic disguises the fact that the vast majority of attendees at City churches live outside the area.

Medieval parish churches in the City
This map shows the medieval churches in the City of London.

 Churches holding regular service 

 Churches demolished or no longer holding regular service 
See also: List of demolished churches in the City of London, List of churches destroyed in the Great Fire of London and not rebuilt

Related lists
 List of churches in London
 List of Christopher Wren churches in London
 List of places of worship in London, 1804
 Union of Benefices Act 1860
 Commission for Building Fifty New Churches

External links/sources
 Anglican Diocese of London
 Baptist Union Churches
 Church of England Parish Finder
 Church of England churches in central London
 The Church of Jesus Christ of Latter-day Saints
 The History Files Churches of the British Isles
 Congregational Churches in London
 Friends of the City Churches
 Gospel Hall Finder
 Greek Orthodox Archdiocese of Thyateira and Great Britain
 Love's Guide to the Church Bells of the City of London
 Methodist Church of Great Britain Church Search
 Roman Catholic Diocese of Brentwood Parishes A-Z
 Roman Catholic Diocese of Westminster – Virtual Diocese
 Roman Catholic Archdiocese of Southwark – Parish Directory
 Seventh-day Adventist Churches in London
 United Reformed Church Find A Church
 Redeemed Christian Church of God

Notes and references

 
 
London
London
Churches